The new towns in the United Kingdom were planned under the powers of the New Towns Act 1946 and later acts to relocate populations in poor or bombed-out housing following the Second World War. They were developed in three waves. Later developments included the expanded towns: existing towns which were substantially expanded to accommodate what was called the "overspill" population from densely populated areas of deprivation. 

Designated new towns were removed from local authority control  and placed under the supervision of a development corporation. These corporations were later disbanded  and their assets split between local authorities and, in England, the Commission for New Towns (later English Partnerships).

Historical precedents

Garden cities

The concept of the "garden city" was first envisaged by Ebenezer Howard in his 1898 book To-morrow: A Peaceful Path to Real Reform, as an alternative to the pollution and overcrowding in Britain's growing urban areas. Taking inspiration from the model villages of Port Sunlight and Bournville, he saw garden cities as the "joyous union" of town and country,   providing a much better quality of life for those who lived there.

Two garden cities were built Letchworth, Hertfordshire in 1903, and Welwyn Garden City, Hertfordshire in 1920.

The underlying principles of garden cities (including community engagement, well designed housing, easily accessible recreational and shopping facilities, and an integrated transport network) were influential in the development of the post-war new towns movement.

Overspill estates

An "overspill estate" is a housing estate planned and built for the housing of excess population in urban areas, both from the natural increase of population and often in order to rehouse people from decaying inner city areas, usually as part of the process of slum clearance. They were created on the outskirts of most large British towns and during most of the 20th century, with new towns being an alternative approach outside London after World War II. The objective of this was to bring more economic activity to these smaller communities, whilst relieving pressure on overpopulated areas of major cities.
 London County Council built housing developments affixed to towns outside London, of which Becontree, Dagenham, was the largest. It was built in the 1920s and 1930s.
 Seacroft in Leeds was built from 1934 when Leeds City Council bought 1,000 acres (4.0 km2) for municipal housing, and after World War II the majority of houses and blocks of flats were built. The council had planned for Seacroft to be a "satellite town within the city boundary" 
 Wythenshawe was built on former rural land in the north of Cheshire between the 1920s and early 1970s to rehouse families from the inner city slums of Manchester as an overspill estate. Other Manchester overspill estates include Hattersley (mostly built during the 1960s), Gamesley, and Haughton Green.
 Castlemilk, Drumchapel, Easterhouse and Pollok in Glasgow.
 Castle Vale in Birmingham, which was built in the 1960s in the extreme north-east of the city.

England

First wave 

The first wave of independent new towns was intended to help alleviate the housing shortages following the Second World War, beyond the green belt around London. A couple of sites in County Durham were also designated. These designations were made under the New Towns Act 1946.
 Stevenage, Hertfordshire (designated 11 November 1946)
 Crawley, Sussex (designated 9 January 1947)
 Hemel Hempstead, Hertfordshire (designated 4 February 1947)
 Harlow, Essex (designated 25 March 1947)
 Newton Aycliffe, County Durham (designated 19 April 1947 as Aycliffe New Town)
 Peterlee, County Durham (designated 10 March 1948, as Easington New Town)
 Welwyn Garden City and Hatfield, Hertfordshire (both designated 20 May 1948)
 Basildon, Essex (designated 4 January 1949)
 Bracknell, Berkshire (designated 17 June 1949)
 Corby, Northamptonshire (designated 1 April 1950)

Second wave

The second wave (1961–64) was likewise initiated to alleviate housing shortfalls. Two of the locations below (Redditch and Dawley New Townlater renamed Telford) are situated near the West Midlands conurbation and were designed for Birmingham and Wolverhampton overspill; another two (Runcorn and Skelmersdale) are near Merseyside and were intended as overspill for the city of Liverpool.

 Skelmersdale, Lancashire (designated 9 October 1961)
 Dawley New Town, Shropshire (designated 16 January 1963)
 Redditch, Worcestershire (designated 10 April 1964)
 Runcorn, Cheshire (designated 10 April 1964)
 Washington, Tyne and Wear (designated 24 July 1964)

Third wave

The third and last wave of new towns (1967–70) allowed for additional growth chiefly further north from the previous London new towns, with a few developments between Liverpool and Manchester, namely "Central Lancashire New Town" and Warrington. Dawley New Town was redesignated as Telford New Town, with a much larger area, as overspill for Birmingham and nearby towns including Wolverhampton. With a target population of 250,000 and a planning brief to become the first "new city", the largest of these was Milton Keynes at the northern edge of the South East, about halfway between Birmingham and London. In the East Midlands, the existing town of Northampton was expanded. In East Anglia, the city of Peterborough was designated as a new town to accommodate overspill from London.

 Milton Keynes, Buckinghamshire (designated 23 January 1967)
 Peterborough, Cambridgeshire (designated 21 July 1967)
 Northampton, Northamptonshire (designated 14 February 1968)
 Warrington, Cheshire (designated 26 April 1968)
 Telford, Shropshire (designated 29 November 1968)
 Central Lancashire New Town, Lancashire (designated 26 March 1970)

Wales
 Cwmbran (designated 4 November 1949)
 Newtown (designated 18 December 1967)

Scotland
Six new towns in Scotland were designated between 1947 and 1973, mostly for the overspill population of Glasgow.

 East Kilbride (designated 6 May 1947)
 Glenrothes (designated 30 June 1948)
 Cumbernauld (designated 9 December 1955, extended 19 March 1973)
 Livingston (designated 16 April 1962)
 Irvine (designated 9 November 1966, and encompassing existing settlement of Kilwinning)
 Stonehouse (designated 17 July 1973, de-designated in 1976 after fewer than 100 houses had been built)

Other major developments
 Ravenscraig (in progress)
 Chapelton of Elsick (in progress)
 Tornagrain, a small private-sector new town near Inverness (in progress)
 Tweedbank, new village built in the 1970s on a greenfield site in the central Scottish Borders, initially by a government body, the Scottish Special Housing Association (SSHA) (population 2,073)
 Erskine and Inchinnan, small new town developed in the 1970s and 1980s in Renfrewshire, initially by the Scottish Special Housing Association (SSHA). (population 16,601)
 Dalgety Bay, small new town developed in the 1970s and 1980s in Fife. (population 10,777)

Future developments
 An Camas Mòr: new settlement proposed in the Cairngorms National Park
 Blindwells: new settlement proposed adjacent to Tranent in East Lothian
 Calderwell: new settlement proposed adjacent to East Calder and Livingston in West Lothian
 Durieshill: new settlement proposed in Stirling Council area adjacent to Plean
 Forestmill: new settlement proposed in Clackmannanshire in close proximity to the Fife Council administrative boundary
 Oudenarde: new settlement proposed adjacent to the Bridge of Earn in Perthshire
 Owenstown: new settlement proposed in the South Lanarkshire area to the south of Lanark
 Shawfair: new settlement proposed in SE Edinburgh spanning the City of Edinburgh Council and Midlothian Council administrative boundaries

Northern Ireland
The New Towns Act (Northern Ireland) 1965 gave the Minister of Development of the Government of Northern Ireland the power to designate an area as a new town, and to appoint a development commission. An order could be made to transfer municipal functions of all or part of any existing local authorities to the commission, which took the additional title of urban district council, although unelected. This was done in the case of Craigavon.

The New Towns Amendment Act 1968 was passed to enable the establishment of the Londonderry Development Commission to replace the County Borough and rural district of Londonderry, and implement the Londonderry Area Plan. On 3 April 1969, the development commission took over the municipal functions of the two councils, the area becoming Londonderry Urban District.

 Craigavon (designated 26 July 1965)
 Antrim (designated 1966) 
 Ballymena (designated 1967) 
 Derry (designated 5 February 1969)

Other 'overspill' developments
During the same period as the new town scheme, several other towns underwent local authority led expansion as 'overspills' to larger urban areas, but were not officially designated as new towns, among these were:
Cramlington, Northumberland - Newcastle
Daventry, Northamptonshire - Birmingham
Killingworth, Tyne and Wear - Newcastle
Kirkby, Merseyside - Liverpool
Tamworth, Staffordshire - Birmingham
Winsford, Cheshire - Liverpool & Manchester

Subsequent town expansion schemes
No new towns have been formally designated in England since 1970 (and Scotland since 1973), but several new large scale developments have been founded:

 Cambourne, Cambridgeshire
 Bar Hill, Cambridgeshire
 South Woodham Ferrers, Essex
 Ebbsfleet, Kent 
 Wixams, Bedfordshire
 Sherford, Devon
 Northstowe, Cambridgeshire
 Cranbrook, Devon
 Nansledan, Cornwall
 Welborne, Hampshire
Poundbury is an experimental new town or urban extension on the outskirts of Dorchester. The development is built on land owned by the Duchy of Cornwall. It is built according to the principles of (then) Prince Charles, who was known for holding strong views challenging the post-war trends in town planning that were suburban in character.

Future developments
On 13 May 2007, chancellor Gordon Brown, who became Prime Minister of the United Kingdom the following month, announced he would designate 10 new "eco-towns" to ease demand for low-cost housing. The towns, around 20,000 population each—at least 5,000 homes—are planned to be "carbon neutral" and will use locally generated sustainable-energy sources. Only one site was identified in the announcement: the former Oakington Barracks in Cambridgeshire—the already planned Northstowe development. Local councils will be invited to provide sites for the remaining four towns.

The Town and Country Planning Association  is advising the government on the criteria and best practice in developing the eco-towns by producing a series of "worksheets" for developers.

In September 2014 the CBI called for all political parties to commit to building 10 new towns and garden cities to get to grips with the country's housing shortage.

South East Faversham is a new settlement proposed by the Duchy of Cornwall adjacent to the M2 in Kent expected to undergo the planning process in 2023.

Legacy
In July 2002 the Select Committee on Transport, Local Government and the Regions assessed the effectiveness of the new towns and concluded that:

While many New Towns have been economically successful, most now are experiencing major problems. Their design is inappropriate to the 21st Century. Their infrastructure is ageing at the same rate and many have social and economic problems. Many are small local authorities which do not have the capacity to resolve their problems. Their attempts to manage the towns are complicated by the role played by English Partnerships which still has major landholdings and other outstanding interests.

The new towns are no longer new and many of the quickly built houses have reached the end of their design life. The masterplans dictated low density development with large amounts of open space, and housing segregated from jobs, shopping and business services. These created a car dependency and are now not considered sustainable. Low density developments are expensive to maintain. Roads and sewers are in need of expensive upgrades.

See also
 Ebenezer Howard
 List of planned cities
 London overspill
New towns of Hong Kong
New towns movement

References

Notes

Further reading 
 
 

 
Articles containing video clips
Housing in the United Kingdom
Town and country planning in the United Kingdom
New towns